Kernal "Kitch" Roberts (born Kernal Lincoln Roberts, 20 September 1980) is a soca producer, singer and songwriter from Trinidad and Tobago. He is best known for producing Trinidad and Tobago Carnival Road March winners in 2006, 2007, 2010 2011 and 2012. He also won the power soca monarch four times in a row from 2010 to 2013.He is currently living at "Rainorama", the home of calypsonian Lord Kitchener, who was Roberts' father.He is also a founding member of the Chinese laundry music group..

References

Soca musicians
Living people
21st-century Trinidad and Tobago male singers
21st-century Trinidad and Tobago singers
1980 births